Music Speaks is the debut studio album by American recording artist and American Idol twelfth season winner Candice Glover, released on February 18, 2014, by Interscope Records. It was preceded by the release of two digital singles, "I Am Beautiful" and "Cried".   In the album, Glover combined the styling of contemporary R&B with 1960s-style lounge music.

Background
Immediately following the broadcast on May 16, 2013, Music Speaks was made available for pre-order on iTunes. Originally scheduled for release on July 16, 2013, the album got pushed back twice, to October 8, 2013, and February 18, 2014. "Cried" was released to promote the album before its release .

Promotion
Glover took part of the American Idols LIVE! Tour 2013, from July 19 to August 31, 2013, in which she performed Music Speaks tracks "In the Middle" and "Lovesong."

On January 5, 2014, she performed "Cried" at the Progressive Skating & Gymnastics Spectacular. On January 19, 2014, the song "Damn" leaked online, however, Glover stated she was ok with it.

On February 3, 2014, Glover did an exclusive performance of Music Speaks' tracks "Lovesong", "In the Middle" and "Cried" for Yahoo! Music. On February 10, 2014, she performed "Cried" at The View and on 106 & Park. On February 12, 2014, snippets of all songs were released by Yahoo! Music.

Critical reception

Music Speaks received generally favorable reviews. At Metacritic, which assigns a normalized rating out of 100 to reviews from mainstream publications, the album received an average score of 62, based on six reviews. Christopher R. Weingarten of Rolling Stone gave the album 2.5 stars out of 5, saying "American Idol'''s 12th victor deserves better than this much-delayed hodgepodge of styles and ideas. The voice that pushed Alicia Keys and U2 songs into unimagined octaves all season long – inspiring judge Nicki Minaj to say, "I want to skin you and wear you" – is on full display. But the songs reveal a serious identity crisis. An entire album of cosmopolitan Mark Ronson-esque pop soul like "Same Kinda Man" and the Shabba Ranks-interpolating "In the Middle" could have been revelatory. Instead, those highlights are jumbled between too many grooves that recall a vague, anonymous version of the decade between Jennifer Holliday and Mary J. Blige."

Mikael Wood of The Los Angeles Times gave the album a positive review, saying "There are signs of individual life here: the palpable regret in "Damn," about falling in love "with someone else's man"; the old-fashioned sass suffusing "In the Middle"; the tension between desire and virtue in "Passenger," with a characteristically woozy beat by producer Mike Will Made It. And, reprised from the show, there is Glover's powerful rendition of the Cure's "Lovesong," which may go down as the final must-see "Idol" performance. TV's loss is music's gain."

Jonathan Frahm of Yahoo! Voices lauded the album, saying "'Music Speaks' is a fantastic debut that is astoundingly exquisite in design, offering a homage to all eras of soul and, most importantly, Candice's prime talents." Continuing to praise Glover's musical ability, Frahm stated, "In knowing her musical journey is far from over and this is just the surprisingly refined beginning of her showcasing what she's able to do, whatever the more experienced artist in Candice Glover's future looks like, I'm sure I'm speaking for all R&B and Idol fans when I say it's going to be a tough wait for her based on the existing product's being so darn talented already."

The Daily News''' Jim Farber also praised Glover's artistry, saying "It helps that her smooth voice sits so comfortably on the songs, content to illuminate their fine tunes rather than over-embellish them with flash."

Commercial performance
The album debuted at No. fourteen on the Billboard 200 chart with sales of 19,000 for the week, at the time, the lowest first week sales of any American Idol winner. By its second week, the album had sold 27,000 copies.

Track listing

Notes
 signifies a co-producer
 signifies a vocal producer

Sampling credit
"In the Middle" contains interpolations of "Ting-A-Ling", written by Rexton Gordon, Wycliffe Johnson, Cleveland Constantine Browne, and Greville Gordon.

Charts

Weekly charts

Year-end charts

References

2014 debut albums
Albums produced by Da Internz
Albums produced by D'Mile
Albums produced by Harvey Mason Jr.
Albums produced by Mike Will Made It
Albums produced by Rock City
Albums produced by Rodney Jerkins
Albums produced by the Underdogs (production team)
Interscope Records albums
19 Recordings albums
Interscope Geffen A&M Records albums